Vichitta Phonevilay (born October 9, 1996) is a Laotian model and beauty pageant titleholder who was crowned Miss Universe Laos 2019. She represented Laos at Miss Universe 2019 pageant.

Pageantry

Miss Universe Laos 2019
Phonevilay won Lao Super Model 2016 and began her pageantry career representing Bolikhamsai in the Miss Universe Laos 2019 competition on August 24, 2019 at the Landmark Mekong Riverside Hotel, where she won the title of Miss Universe Laos 2019. She was crowned by outgoing titleholder On-anong Homsombath.

Miss Universe 2019
As the winner of the title, Phonevilay represented Laos at the Miss Universe 2019 pageant but however, she was unplaced.

References

External links

1996 births
Laotian beauty pageant winners
Laotian models
Living people
Miss Universe 2019 contestants
People from Bolikhamsai province
People from Vientiane
21st-century Laotian women